Qaleh Ekhlas (also Romanized as Qal‘eh Ekhlāş; also known as Ghal‘eh Ekhlas) is a village in Karchambu-e Jonubi Rural District, in the Central District of Buin va Miandasht County, Isfahan Province, Iran. At the 2006 census, its population was 250, in 53 families.

References 

Populated places in Buin va Miandasht County